The third season of the American television series Haven premiered September 21, 2012 and consisted a total of 13 episodes. The show stars Emily Rose, Lucas Bryant and Eric Balfour.

Cast

Main cast
 Emily Rose as Audrey Parker / Lucy Ripley / Sarah Vernon
 Lucas Bryant as Nathan Wuornos
 Eric Balfour as Duke Crocker

Recurring cast
 Richard Donat as Vince Teagues
 John Dunsworth as Dave Teagues
 Edge (credited as WWE Superstar Edge) as Dwight Hendrickson
 Bree Williamson as Claire Callahan
 Dorian Missick as Tommy Bowen
 Kate Kelton as Jordan McKee
 Maurice Dean Wint as Agent Byron Howard
 Steve Lund as James Cogan

Guest stars
 Claudia Black as Moira
 Nolan North as Will Brady
 Iain Glen as Roland Holloway
 Laura Vandervoort as Arla Cogan
 Melanie Scrofano as Noelle
 Nicholas Campbell as Garland Wuornos

a  Kelton was also credited in "Stay", but her appearance in that episode was cut.
b  Also credited in the cast bill in "Over My Head".
c  Credited as a special guest star.

Episodes

Production
On October 12, 2011, Syfy picked up Haven for a thirteen-episode third season expected to air in 2012, with production beginning on April 18. As the last two seasons ended with a cliffhanger, this season picked up where season two left off. 

Adam "Edge" Copeland returned to the series after originally starting out as a guest in season 2 before his role was expanded to recurring that season. Bree Williamson joined the cast as Claire Callahan. Dorian Missick and Kate Kelton also joined the cast in recurring roles. 

Season 3's guest stars include Iain Glen along with Nolan North and Claudia Black, who both co-starred with Emily Rose in the Uncharted videogame series, and Laura Vandervoort.

The season's penultimate episode "Reunion", which dealt with a string of murders at Haven High School, and the season finale "Thanks for the Memories" were originally slated to air on December 14 and 21 respectively but Syfy pulled both episodes from the schedule and moved them to January 17, 2013 as a back-to-back season finale with repeats of the Eureka and Warehouse 13 holiday episodes airing in their place due to the Sandy Hook Elementary School shooting that occurred on the day "Reunion" was going to air.

Home media release

References

External links
 
 List of Haven episodes at The Futon Critic
 List of Haven episodes at MSN TV

2012 American television seasons
2013 American television seasons
3